Danny Lyon (born March 16, 1942) is an American photographer and filmmaker.

All of Lyon's publications work in the style of photographic New Journalism, meaning that the photographer has become immersed in, and is a participant of, the documented subject. He is the founding member of the publishing group Bleak Beauty.

After being accepted as the photographer for Student Nonviolent Coordinating Committee (SNCC), Lyon was present at almost all of the major historical events during the Civil Rights Movement.

He has had solo exhibits at the Whitney Museum of American Art, the Art Institute of Chicago, the Menil Collection, the M. H. de Young Memorial Museum in San Francisco and the Center for Creative Photography at the University of Arizona. Lyon twice received a Guggenheim Fellowship; a Rockefeller Fellowship, Missouri Honor Medal for Distinguished Service in Journalism; and a Lucie Award.

Early life
Lyon was born in 1942 in Brooklyn, New York and is the son of Russian-Jewish mother Rebecca Henkin and German-Jewish father Dr. Ernst Fredrick Lyon. He was raised in Kew Gardens, Queens, and went on to study history and philosophy at the University of Chicago, where he graduated with a Bachelor of Arts degree in 1963.

Civil rights work 
Lyon began his involvement in the civil rights movement when he hitch-hiked to Cairo, Illinois, during a summer break after his junior year at the University of Chicago. He was inspired by a speech John Lewis had given at a church on his first day in Cairo. After his speech Lewis left to go attend a sit-in, Lyon was impressed by this, Lewis was putting action behind his words. Lyon then decided to march to a nearby segregated swimming pool, the demonstrators knelt down to pray as the pool-goers heckled them. Soon a truck came, it went through the crowd in an attempt to break it up, a young black girl was hit by the truck and Lyon knew that he wanted to be a part of the movement.  For a time after this, in the 1960s, Lewis and Lyon were roommates.

In September 1962 with a $300 donation by Harry Belafonte, SNCC flew Lyon to Jackson and the Mississippi Delta to cover voter registration workers. Shortly after, Lyon had a run-in with the police, one of whom threatened to kill him because when told they “didn’t mix the races down here”, Lyon claimed he had a Black grandfather. Lyon left town in order to keep all the pictures he had taken safe from being confiscated.

In 1963 Lyon returned, but the SNCC was reluctant to bring him aboard as their photographer. One job Lyon participated in was getting a picture of some high-school girls who were in prison at the Leesburg Stockade without any charges against them. He hid in the back of a car while someone else drove him to the prison, and the young man who drove distracted the guards while Lyon snuck in the back to get the photo.

After being accepted as the photographer for SNCC, Lyon was present at almost all of the major historical events during the movement capturing the moments with his camera.

His pictures appeared in The Movement: documentary of a struggle for equality, a documentary book about the Civil Rights Movement in the southern region of the United States.

Later work
Later, Lyon began creating his own books. His first, was a study of outlaw motorcyclists in the collection The Bikeriders (1968), where Lyon did more than just photograph motorcyclists in the American Midwest from 1963 to 1967. Additionally, he also became a member of the Chicago Outlaws motorcycle club and traveled with them, sharing their lifestyle. According to Lyon himself, the photographs were "an attempt to record and glorify the life of the American bikerider." The series was immensely popular and influential in the 1960s and 1970s. By 1967 he was invited to join Magnum Photos. He never became a full member.  During the 1970s, he also contributed to the Environmental Protection Agency's DOCUMERICA project.

In 1969, when Lyon returned from his work in Texas to New York City, and had no place to live, the photographer Robert Frank, famous by then for his 1958 book The Americans, took him in.  Lyon had met Frank two years earlier, at the end of a Happening that Lyon was part of, in New York City. Lyon lived with the Frank family for six months in the city, in an apartment on West 86th St.

The Destruction of Lower Manhattan (1969) was Lyon's next work, published by Macmillan Publishers in 1969.  The book documents the large-scale demolition taking place throughout Lower Manhattan in 1967.  Included are photographs of soon to be demolished streets and buildings, portraits of the neighborhood's last remaining stragglers and pictures from within the demolition sites themselves.  The book was eventually remaindered for one dollar each, but soon attained the status of a collector's item.  It was reprinted in 2005.

Conversations with the Dead (1971) was published with full cooperation of the Texas Department of Corrections. Lyon photographed in six prisons over a 14-month period in 1967-68. The series was printed in book form in 1971 by Holt publishing. The introduction points to a statement of purpose that the penal system of Texas is symbolic for incarceration everywhere. He states, "I tried with whatever power I had to make a picture of imprisonment as distressing as I knew it to be in reality."

Lyon befriended many of the prisoners. The book also includes texts taken from prison records, letters from convicts, and inmate artwork. In particular, the book focuses on the case of Billy McCune, a convicted rapist whose death sentence was eventually commuted to life in prison. In the foreword, Lyon describes McCune as a diagnosed psychotic, who one evening, while awaiting execution, "cut his penis off to the root and, placing it in a cup, passed it between the bars to the guard."

All of Lyon's publications work in the style of photographic New Journalism, meaning that the photographer has become immersed, and is a participant, of the documented subject.

He is the founding member of the publishing group Bleak Beauty. He was greatly encouraged in his photography by curator of the Art Institute of Chicago Hugh Edwards, who gave Lyon two solo exhibits as a young man.

Also a filmmaker and writer, Lyon's films and videos include Los Niños Abandonados, Born to Film, Willie, and Murderers. He has published the non-fiction book Like A Thief's Dream.

Publications
The Bikeriders.
London: Macmillan, 1968.
Santa Fe, NM: Twin Palms, 1998. .
 New York City: Aperture, 2014. . Facsimile edition.
Conversations With The Dead.
New York City: Henry Holt and Company, 1971. .
Conversations With The Dead: Photographs of Prison Life with the Letters and Drawings of Billy McCune #122054. . Digitally remastered facsimile edition with a new afterword by Lyon.
Pictures from the New World. New York City: Aperture, 1981.
I Like To Eat Right On The Dirt. Clintondale, NY: Bleak Beauty, 1989.
Memories of the Southern Civil Rights Movement.
Memories of the Southern Civil Rights Movement. The Lyndhurst Series on the South. Center for Documentary Studies at Duke University; University of North Carolina, 1992. . Edited by Alex Harris.
Memories of the Southern Civil Rights Movement. Santa Fe, NM: Twin Palms, 2010. .
Indian Nations. Twin Palms, 2002.
The Destruction of Lower Manhattan. New York City: PowerHouse, 2005.
Like A Thief's Dream. New York City: PowerHouse, 2007.
Memories of Myself. London; New York City: Phaidon, 2009.
Deep Sea Diver. London; New York City: Phaidon, 2011.
The Seventh Dog. London; New York City: Phaidon, 2014.
Burn Zone. Albuquerque, NM: Bleak Beauty. . With texts by Josephine Ferorelli.

Awards
1969: Guggenheim Fellowship from the Solomon R. Guggenheim Foundation
1978: Guggenheim Fellowship from the Solomon R. Guggenheim Foundation
1980s: Fellowship in Film making from the Rockefeller Foundation
2011: Missouri Honor Medal for Distinguished Service in Journalism, Missouri School of Journalism, University of Missouri, Columbia, MO
2015: Lucie Awards, "Achievement in Documentary" category
2022: Induction into the International Photography Hall of Fame and Museum.

See also
 List of photographers of the civil rights movement

References

External links

 The films of Danny Lyon on Vimeo
 SNCC Digital Gateway: Danny Lyon, Documentary website created by the SNCC Legacy Project and Duke University, telling the story of the Student Nonviolent Coordinating Committee and grassroots organizing from the inside-out
 "Stubbornly Practicing His Principles of Photography," New York Times, April 26, 2009
"‘Danny Lyon: Message to the Future’ Review: From Civil Rights to Occupy", by Richard B. Woodward, The Wall Street Journal, July 27, 2016
 An Interview with Filmmaker Danny Lyon Part I and Part II, Chicago Film Society, 2017
 , at the Whitney Museum of American Art

1942 births
Living people
Jewish American artists
American photojournalists
Motorcycling writers
University of Chicago alumni
People from Brooklyn
American people of Russian-Jewish descent
American people of German-Jewish descent
Journalists from New York City
21st-century American Jews
People from New Mexico by occupation
Artists from New Mexico
20th-century American male artists